Mikhail Ivanovich Lapshin (1 September 1934 – 17 June 2006) was the Head of the Altai Republic in Russia from 2002 to 2006.

Lapshin was born in Setovka, in what is now Altai Krai.  He was an ethnic Russian, but registered as ethnic Altai in the 2002 census when he was Head of the Altai Republic.

He was founder of the Agrarian Party of Russia and served as its leader between 1993 and 2004.

He became Head of the Altai Republic in January 2002. He defeated incumbent Semyon Zubakin in the December 2001 elections with 68% of the vote. In the first round of the elections, Lapshin and Zubakin were in a field of many candidates, and Lapshin received 23% of the vote. Lapshin survived an impeachment attempt in March 2005 by a vote of 22–14 in the state assembly. In December 2005, as his term was expiring, Lapshin was not renominated by President Vladimir Putin for another term, which was necessary for him to continue in office because of changes in the law. He was succeeded on 20 January 2006, by one of his 2001 election opponents, Alexander Berdnikov.

He is interred at Troyekurovskoye Cemetery in Moscow.

References 

1934 births
2006 deaths
People from Altai Krai
Heads of the Altai Republic
Members of the Federation Council of Russia (after 2000)
Burials in Troyekurovskoye Cemetery
Agrarian Party of Russia politicians
First convocation members of the State Duma (Russian Federation)
Second convocation members of the State Duma (Russian Federation)
Third convocation members of the State Duma (Russian Federation)